The first typhoon shelter built in Hong Kong was the Causeway Bay Typhoon Shelter, completed in 1883. It was followed by the Yau Ma Tei Typhoon Shelter, inaugurated in 1915.

The following is a list of typhoon shelters in Hong Kong:

Current

Decommissioned
Ngong Shuen Wan Typhoon Shelter - closed 1990s
Chai Wan Typhoon Shelter - closed 1990s
Yung Shue Wan Typhoon Shelter
Wan Chai Typhoon Shelter
Shap Long Wan Typhoon Shelter
Shau Kei Wan Typhoon Shelter - the older one
 Causeway Bay Typhoon Shelter - reclaimed for Victoria Park
 Jordan Road Typhoon Shelter
 Yau Ma Tei Typhoon Shelter

References

Typhoon shelters
Typhoon shelters